Nguyễn Thị Minh Khai is an urban ward (phường) of Bắc Kạn Township, Bắc Kạn Province, in northeastern Vietnam. The ward is named after the Vietnamese revolutionary Nguyễn Thị Minh Khai, who had been executed by the French colonial government in Vietnam in 1941.

Populated places in Bắc Kạn province
Communes of Bắc Kạn province
Bắc Kạn